Ted Tryba (born January 15, 1967) is an American professional golfer who has played on the PGA Tour and the Nationwide Tour.

Tryba was born in Wilkes-Barre, Pennsylvania. He played at Ohio State University. When he was four years old, he lost the sight in his left eye as the result of a freak accident. "I was standing in my yard on a windy day watching a big branch fall out of a tree. It got on me quick and hit me in the eye." All he could do was learn to adjust to his vision handicap. "I really had no big adjustments to make," he said. "If there is such a thing as a lucky accident, I guess that was it. If it had happened when I was a teenager or in my 20s, I may have had some problems. I see things a little different than everybody else. Sometimes it makes it difficult to do things, but I've never used it as a crutch."

Tryba has two victories on PGA Tour and three on the Nationwide Tour. His best finish in a major is T31 at the 1999 PGA Championship. He has featured in the top 50 of the Official World Golf Rankings. He last entered a PGA Tour event in 2013 and has not made a cut on tour since 2005. 

Tryba lives in Orlando, Florida.

Tryba joined The Golf Channel as an analyst in October 2007.

Professional wins (5)

PGA Tour wins (2)

PGA Tour playoff record (0–1)

Ben Hogan Tour wins (3)

Ben Hogan Tour playoff record (1–1)

Results in major championships

CUT = missed the half-way cut
"T" indicates a tie for a place

Results in The Players Championship

CUT = missed the halfway cut
"T" indicates a tie for a place

Results in World Golf Championships

QF, R16, R32, R64 = Round in which player lost in match play
"T" = Tied

See also
1989 PGA Tour Qualifying School graduates
1992 Ben Hogan Tour graduates

References

External links

American male golfers
Ohio State Buckeyes men's golfers
PGA Tour golfers
Korn Ferry Tour graduates
Golfers from Pennsylvania
Golfers from Orlando, Florida
Sportspeople from Wilkes-Barre, Pennsylvania
1967 births
Living people